In mathematics, a free abelian group is an abelian group with a basis. Being an abelian group means that it is a set with an addition operation that is associative, commutative, and invertible. A basis, also called an integral basis, is a subset such that every element of the group can be uniquely expressed as an integer combination of finitely many basis elements. For instance the two-dimensional integer lattice forms a free abelian group, with coordinatewise addition as its operation, and with the two points (1,0) and (0,1) as its basis. Free abelian groups have properties which make them similar to vector spaces, and may equivalently be called free  the free modules over the integers. Lattice theory studies free abelian subgroups of real vector spaces. In algebraic topology, free abelian groups are used to define chain groups, and in algebraic geometry they are used to define divisors. 

The elements of a free abelian group with basis  may be described in several equivalent ways. These include formal sums  which are expressions of the form  where each  is a nonzero integer, each  is a distinct basis element, and the sum has finitely many terms. Alternatively, the elements of a free abelian group may be thought of as signed multisets containing finitely many elements  with the multiplicity of an element in the multiset equal to its coefficient in the formal sum. 

This group is unique in the sense that every two free abelian groups with the same basis are isomorphic. The rank of a free abelian group is the cardinality of a basis; every two bases for the same group give the same rank, and every two free abelian groups with the same rank are isomorphic. Every subgroup of a free abelian group is itself free abelian; this fact allows a general abelian group to be understood as a quotient of a free abelian group by "relations", or as a cokernel of an injective homomorphism between free abelian groups. The only free abelian groups that are free groups are the trivial group and the infinite cyclic group.

Definition and examples

A free abelian group is an abelian group that has a basis. Here, being an abelian group means that it is described by a set  of its elements and a binary operation  conventionally denoted as an additive group by the  symbol (although it need not be the usual addition of numbers) that obey the following properties:
The operation  is commutative and associative, meaning for all elements      and  Therefore, when combining two or more elements of  using this operation, the ordering and grouping of the elements does not affect the result.
 contains an identity element (conventionally denoted  with the property that, for every  
Every element  in  has an inverse element  such that 
As a special case, the identity element can always be formed in this way as the combination of zero basis elements, according to the usual convention for an empty sum, and it must not be possible to find any other combination that represents the identity.

The  under the usual addition operation, form a free abelian group with the  The integers are commutative and associative, with 0 as the additive identity and with each integer having an additive inverse, its negation. Each non-negative  is the sum of  copies  and each negative integer  is the sum of  copies  so the basis property is also satisfied.

An example where the group operation is different from the usual addition of numbers is given by the positive rational numbers  which form a free abelian group with the usual multiplication operation on numbers and with the prime numbers as their basis.

As an abstract group, this is the same as (an isomorphic group to) the multiplicative group of positive rational numbers. Because these mappings merely reinterpret the same numbers, they define a bijection between the elements of the two groups. And because the group operation of multiplying positive rationals acts additively on the exponents of the prime numbers, in the same way that the group operation of adding polynomials acts on the coefficients of the polynomials, these maps preserve the group structure; they are homomorphisms. A bijective homomorphism is called an isomorphism, and its existence demonstrates that these two groups have the same properties.

Although the representation of each group element in terms of a given basis is unique, a free abelian group has generally more than one basis, and different bases will generally result in different representations of its elements. For example, if one replaces any element of a basis by its inverse, one gets another basis. As a more elaborated example, the two-dimensional integer lattice  consisting of the points in the plane with integer Cartesian coordinates, forms a free abelian group under vector addition with the basis  For this basis, the element  can be written  where 'multiplication' is defined so that, for instance,  There is no other way to write  in the same basis. However, with a different basis such as  it can be written as  Generalizing this example, every lattice forms a finitely-generated free abelian group. The  integer lattice  has a natural basis consisting of the positive integer unit vectors, but it has many other bases as well: if  is a  integer matrix with  then the rows of  form a basis, and conversely every basis of the integer lattice has this form. For more on the two-dimensional case, see fundamental pair of periods.

Constructions
Every set can be the basis of a free abelian group, which is unique up to group isomorphisms. The free abelian group for a given basis set can be constructed in several different but equivalent ways: as a direct sum of copies of the integers, as a family of integer-valued functions, as a signed multiset, or by a presentation of a group.

Products and sums
The direct product of groups consists of tuples of an element from each group in the product, with componentwise addition. The direct product of two free abelian groups is itself free abelian, with basis the disjoint union of the bases of the two groups. More generally the direct product of any finite number of free abelian groups is free abelian. The  integer lattice, for instance, is isomorphic to the direct product of  copies of the integer  The trivial group  is also considered to be free abelian, with basis the empty set. It may be interpreted as an empty product, the direct product of zero copies 

For infinite families of free abelian groups, the direct product is not necessarily free abelian. For instance the Baer–Specker group  an uncountable group formed as the direct product of countably many copies  was shown in 1937 by Reinhold Baer to not be free abelian, although Ernst Specker proved in 1950 that all of its countable subgroups are free abelian. Instead, to obtain a free abelian group from an infinite family of groups, the direct sum rather than the direct product should be used. The direct sum and direct product are the same when they are applied to finitely many groups, but differ on infinite families of groups. In the direct sum, the elements are again tuples of elements from each group, but with the restriction that all but finitely many of these elements are the identity for their group. The direct sum of infinitely many free abelian groups remains free abelian. It has a basis consisting of tuples in which all but one element is the identity, with the remaining element part of a basis for its group.

Every free abelian group may be described as a direct sum of copies  with one copy for each member of its basis. This construction allows any set  to become the basis of a free abelian group.

Integer functions and formal sums

In this way, every set  can be made into the basis of a free abelian group.

The elements of  may also be written as formal sums, expressions in the form of a sum of finitely many terms, where each term is written as the product of a nonzero integer with a distinct member  These expressions are considered equivalent when they have the same terms, regardless of the ordering of terms, and they may be added by forming the union of the terms, adding the integer coefficients to combine terms with the same basis element, and removing terms for which this combination produces a zero coefficient. They may also be interpreted as the signed multisets of finitely many elements

Presentation
A presentation of a group is a set of elements that generate the group (meaning that all group elements can be expressed as products of finitely many generators), together with "relators", products of generators that give the identity element. The elements of a group defined in this way are equivalence classes of sequences of generators and their inverses, under an equivalence relation that allows inserting or removing any relator or generator-inverse pair as a contiguous subsequence. More generally, if all pairs of generators commute, then all pairs of products of generators also commute. Therefore, the group generated by this presentation is abelian, and the relators of the presentation form a minimal set of relators needed to ensure that it is abelian.

When the set of generators is finite, the presentation of a free abelian group is also finite, because there are only finitely many different commutators to include in the presentation. This fact, together with the fact that every subgroup of a free abelian group is free abelian (below) can be used to show that every finitely generated abelian group is finitely presented.

As a module
The modules over the integers are defined similarly to vector spaces over the real numbers or rational numbers: they consist of systems of elements that can be added to each other, with an operation for scalar multiplication by integers that is compatible with this addition operation. Every abelian group may be considered as a module over the integers, with a scalar multiplication operation defined as follows:

However, unlike vector spaces, not all abelian groups have a basis, hence the special name "free" for those that do. A free module is a module that can be represented as a direct sum over its base ring, so free abelian groups and free  are equivalent concepts: each free abelian group is (with the multiplication operation above) a free  and each free  comes from a free abelian group in this way. As well as the direct sum, another way to combine free abelian groups is to use the tensor product of  The tensor product of two free abelian groups is always free abelian, with a basis that is the Cartesian product of the bases for the two groups in the product.

Many important properties of free abelian groups may be generalized to free modules over a principal ideal domain. For instance, submodules of free modules over principal ideal domains are free, a fact that  writes allows for "automatic generalization" of homological machinery to these modules. Additionally, the theorem that every projective  is free generalizes in the same way.

Properties

Universal property
Here, a group homomorphism is a mapping from one group to the other that is consistent with the group product law: performing a product before or after the mapping produces the same result. By a general property of universal properties, this shows that "the" abelian group of base  is unique up to an isomorphism. Therefore, the universal property can be used as a definition of the free abelian group of base . The uniqueness of the group defined by this property shows that all the other definitions are equivalent.

It is because of this universal property that free abelian groups are called "free": they are the free objects in the category of abelian groups, the category that has abelian groups as its objects and homomorphisms as its arrows. The map from a basis to its free abelian group is a functor, a structure-preserving mapping of categories, from sets to abelian groups, and is adjoint to the forgetful functor from abelian groups to sets. However, a free abelian group is not a free group except in two cases: a free abelian group having an empty basis (rank zero, giving the trivial group) or having just one element in the basis (rank one, giving the infinite cyclic group). In the general category of groups, it is an added constraint to demand that , whereas this is a necessary property in the category of abelian groups.

Rank
Every two bases of the same free abelian group have the same cardinality, so the cardinality of a basis forms an invariant of the group known as its rank. Two free abelian groups are isomorphic if and only if they have the same rank.

This notion of rank can be generalized, from free abelian groups to abelian groups that are not necessarily free. Equivalently, it is the cardinality of a maximal subset of  that generates a free subgroup. The rank is a group invariant: it does not depend on the choice of the subgroup.

Subgroups
Every subgroup of a free abelian group is itself a free abelian group.  This result of Richard Dedekind was a precursor to the analogous Nielsen–Schreier theorem that every subgroup of a free group is free, and is a generalization of the fact that every nontrivial subgroup of the infinite cyclic group is infinite cyclic. The proof needs the axiom of choice. A proof using Zorn's lemma (one of many equivalent assumptions to the axiom of choice) can be found in Serge Lang's Algebra. Solomon Lefschetz and Irving Kaplansky argue that using the well-ordering principle in place of Zorn's lemma leads to a more intuitive proof.

In the case of finitely generated free abelian groups, the proof is easier, does not need the axiom of choice, and leads to a more precise result. A constructive proof of the existence part of the theorem is provided by any algorithm computing the Smith normal form of a matrix of integers. Uniqueness follows from the fact that, for any , the greatest common divisor of the minors of rank  of the matrix is not changed during the Smith normal form computation and is the product  at the end of the computation.

Torsion and divisibility
All free abelian groups are torsion-free, meaning that there is no non-identity group element  and nonzero integer  such that .
Conversely, all finitely generated torsion-free abelian groups are free abelian.

The additive group of rational numbers  provides an example of a torsion-free (but not finitely generated) abelian group that is not free abelian. One reason that  is not free abelian is that it is divisible, meaning that, for every element  and every nonzero integer , it is possible to express  as a scalar multiple  of another element . In contrast, non-trivial free abelian groups are never divisible, because in a free abelian group the basis elements cannot be expressed as multiples of other elements.

Symmetry
The symmetries of any group can be described as group automorphisms, the invertible homomorphisms from the group to itself. In non-abelian groups these are further subdivided into inner and outer automorphisms, but in abelian groups all non-identity automorphisms are outer. They form another group, the automorphism group of the given group, under the operation of composition. The automorphism group of a free abelian group of finite rank  is the general linear group , which can be described concretely (for a specific basis of the free automorphism group) as the set of  invertible integer matrices under the operation of matrix multiplication. Their action as symmetries on the free abelian group  is just matrix-vector multiplication.

The automorphism groups of two infinite-rank free abelian groups have the same first-order theories as each other, if and only if their ranks are equivalent cardinals from the point of view of second-order logic. This result depends on the structure of involutions of free abelian groups, the automorphisms that are their own inverse. Given a basis for a free abelian group, one can find involutions that map any set of disjoint pairs of basis elements to each other, or that negate any chosen subset of basis elements, leaving the other basis elements fixed. Conversely, for every involution of a free abelian group, one can find a basis of the group for which all basis elements are swapped in pairs, negated, or left unchanged by the involution.

Relation to other groups
If a free abelian group is a quotient of two groups , then  is the direct sum .

Then a surjection can be defined 
That is, the surjection maps

where  is the integer coefficient of basis element  in a given formal sum,
This surjection is the unique group homomorphism which extends the function , and so its construction can be seen as an instance of the universal property.

Therefore, these groups form a short exact sequence

Furthermore, assuming the axiom of choice, the free abelian groups are precisely the projective objects in the category of abelian groups.

Applications

Algebraic topology

In algebraic topology, a formal sum of -dimensional simplices is called a -chain, and the free abelian group having a collection of -simplices as its basis is called a chain group. The simplices are generally taken from some topological space, for instance as the set of -simplices in a simplicial complex, or the set of singular -simplices in a manifold. Any -dimensional simplex has a boundary that can be represented as a formal sum of -dimensional simplices, and the universal property of free abelian groups allows this boundary operator to be extended to a group homomorphism from -chains to -chains. The system of chain groups linked by boundary operators in this way forms a chain complex, and the study of chain complexes forms the basis of homology theory.

Algebraic geometry and complex analysis

Every rational function over the complex numbers can be associated with a signed multiset of complex numbers , the zeros and poles of the function (points where its value is zero or infinite). The multiplicity  of a point in this multiset is its order as a zero of the function, or the negation of its order as a pole.
Then the function itself can be recovered from this data, up to a scalar factor, as

If these multisets are interpreted as members of a free abelian group over the complex numbers, then the product or quotient of two rational functions corresponds to the sum or difference of two group members. Thus, the multiplicative group of rational functions can be factored into the multiplicative group of complex numbers (the associated scalar factors for each function) and the free abelian group over the complex numbers. The rational functions that have a nonzero limiting value at infinity (the meromorphic functions on the Riemann sphere) form a subgroup of this group in which the sum of the multiplicities is zero.

This construction has been generalized, in algebraic geometry, to the notion of a divisor. There are different definitions of divisors, but in general they form an abstraction of a codimension-one subvariety of an algebraic variety, the set of solution points of a system of polynomial equations. In the case where the system of equations has one degree of freedom (its solutions form an algebraic curve or Riemann surface), a subvariety has codimension one when it consists of isolated points, and in this case a divisor is again a signed multiset of points from the variety. The meromorphic functions on a compact Riemann surface have finitely many zeros and poles, and their divisors form a subgroup of a free abelian group over the points of the surface, with multiplication or division of functions corresponding to addition or subtraction of group elements. To be a divisor, an element of the free abelian group must have multiplicities summing to zero, and meet certain additional constraints depending on the surface.

Group rings
When  is finite and abelian, the multiplicative group of units in  has the structure of a direct product of a finite group and a finitely generated free abelian group.

References

Abelian group theory
Properties of groups
Free algebraic structures